HDR10+ is a high dynamic range (HDR) video technology that adds dynamic metadata to HDR10 source files. The dynamic metadata are used to adjust and optimize each frame of the HDR video to the consumer display's capabilities in a way based on the content creator's intents.

HDR10+ is an alternative to Dolby Vision, which also uses dynamic metadata. HDR10+ is the default variant of dynamic metadata as part of the HDMI 2.1 standard.

HDR10+ Adaptive is an update designed to optimize HDR10+ content according to the ambient light.

Description
HDR10+, also known as HDR10 Plus, was announced on 20 April 2017, by Samsung and Amazon Video. HDR10+ updates HDR10 by adding dynamic metadata that can be used to more accurately adjust brightness levels up tothe full range of PQ code values (10,000 nits maximum brightness) on a scene-by-scene or frame-by-frame basis. The technology is standardized and defined in SMPTE ST 2094-40. HDR10+ is an open standard and is royalty-free; it is supported by a growing list of post-production software and tools. A certification and logo program for HDR10+ device manufacturers is available with an annual administration fee for certain adopter categories and no per-unit royalty. Authorized test centers conduct certification testing for HDR10+ devices.

On 28 August 2017, Samsung, Panasonic, and 20th Century Fox created the HDR10+ Alliance to promote the HDR10+ standard. HDR10+ video started being offered by Amazon Video on 13 December 2017. On 5 January 2018, Warner Bros. announced their support for the HDR10+ standard. On 6 January 2018, Panasonic announced Ultra HD Blu-ray players with support for HDR10+. On 4 April 2019, Universal Pictures Home Entertainment announced a technology collaboration with Samsung Electronics to release new titles mastered with HDR10+. It is considered to have most of the advantages of Dolby Vision over HDR10, as well as being royalty free.

HDR10+ signals the dynamic range and scene characteristics on a scene-by-scene or even frame-by-frame basis. The display device then uses the dynamic metadata to apply an appropriate tone map through the process of dynamic tone mapping. Dynamic tone mapping differs from static tone mapping by applying a different tone curve from scene-to-scene rather than use a single tone curve for an entire video.

HDR10+ and Dolby Vision do not use the same dynamic metadata.

Technical details

HDR10+ content profile
 EOTF: SMPTE ST 2084 (PQ)
 Chroma subsampling: 4:2:0 (for compressed video sources)
 Resolution: Agnostic (2K/4K/8K, etc.)
 Bit depth: 10-bit or more (up to 16-bit) per color channel
 Color primaries: ITU-R BT.2020
 Maximum linearized pixel value: 10,000 cd/m2 for each color R/G/B (content)
 Metadata (required): Mastering Display Color Volume Metadata
 Metadata (optional): MaxCLL, MaxFALL

HDR10+ technology can support the full range of HDR standards to 10,000 cd/m2, 8K and BT.2020 color gamut. Being resolution agnostic, metadata needs to be created only once and can be applied to any target resolution.

HDR10+ is supported in video encoding technologies HEVC, AV1, VP9 compatibility via WebM as well as any codec that supports ITU-T T.35 metadata.

Workflow and ecosystem

HDR10+ utilizes an HDR10 master file within existing HDR post-production and distribution workflows.

The HDR10+ ecosystem is used within current systems by,
 storing HDR10+ metadata in JSON files
 embedding HDR10+ metadata into HDR10 encoded content
 distribution through digital stream (e.g. streaming with HDR10+ SEI)
 displaying HDR10+ content on a capable display (e.g. HDMI interfaces with HDR10+ VSIF) and mobile devices

Metadata generation

For offline and video-on-demand (VOD) (e.g. ultra-high-definition Blu-ray, over-the-top (OTT), multi-channel video programming distributor (MVPD)), HDR10+ metadata may be created during the post-production, mastering process or during transcoding/encoding for distribution back-ends by HDR10+ content generation tools in two steps,

 Identifying scene cuts, and
 Performing an image analysis on each scene or frame to derive statistics

HDR10+ metadata is interchanged through a low complexity JSON-structured text file, which is then parsed and injected into video files.

Live encoding

Live use cases are possible by delivering HDR10+ metadata in every frame. HEVC encoders generate and inject metadata on live content and mobile phones record video and create HDR10+ metadata in real-time during recording.  Live encoding is detailed in the Live Encoder Workflow diagram and real time broadcast operations are supported at the point of transmission enabling a metadata-less broadcast operation.

Compatibility

HDR10+ metadata follows ITU-T T.35 and can co-exist with other HDR metadata such as HDR10 static metadata that makes HDR10+ content backward compatible with non-HDR10+ TVs. HDR10+ metadata is ignored by devices that do not support the format and video is played back in HDR10.

Administration
HDR10+ Technologies, LLC administers the license and certification program for products that want to adopt HDR10+. HDR10+ Technologies, LLC provides the technical specifications, test specifications, and certified logo.

Founders
 20th Century Fox (now 20th Century Studios)
 Panasonic Corporation
 Samsung Electronics

Authorized test centers
Certification of products is done through authorized test centers. The following are a list of HDR10+ authorized test centers:
 Allion – Japan
 Allion Shenzhen – China
 Allion Taipei – Taiwan
 BluFocus – United States
 Kwangsung – South Korea
 SGS-CSTC Standards Technical Services Co. Ltd – China
 Shenzen CESI Information Technology Co., Ltd – China 
 TIRT – China
 TTA – South Korea

Adoption

Adopters

 Apple
 Amazon
 Evertz AV
 Panasonic Corporation
 Telechips
 Amlogic (Shanghai) Co., Ltd.
 Extron Electronics
 Parade Technologies, Inc.
 Teledyne LeCroy
 Andy Fiord Production Company
 FF Pictures GmbH
 Pixelogic Media Partners LLC
 TFI Digital Media
 Arcelik
 Fidelity in Motion
 Pixelworks, Inc.
 Top Victory Electronics -TPV
 Arm Limited
 Giant Interactive
 Pixtree, Inc.
 Toshiba Visual Solutions Corp
 Astro Design
 Grass Valley K.K.
 Turbine Medien GmbH
 ATEME SA
 Guangdong Oppo Mobile
 Qualcomm
 20th Century Studios Inc.
 Audio Partnership PLC
 Interra Systems
 Rakuten TV
 Unigraf Oy
 Beijing Xiaomi Mobile Software
 Inventory Films
 Realme Chongqing Mobile
 US Screen Corp
 Blackmagic Design Technology  Pte Ltd
 Ivi.ru LLC
 Realtek Semiconductor Corp.
 V-Silicon Inc.
 Blackshark Technologies
 JVCKENWOOD Corp
 Rohde & Schwarz GmbH & Co. KG
 Venera Technologies
 Broadcom
 Loewe Technologies GmbH
 Samsung Research America
 VeriSilicon, Inc
 Capella Systems
 Lussier
 Shenzhen SDMC Technology Co., Ltd
 Vestel Elektronik
 Chrontel
 MediaArea.net
 Shenzhen TCL New Technolog Co., Ltd.
 Vicom
 Colorfront
 Media Tek Inc.
 Shenzhen Zidoo Technology Co., Ltd.
 VideoQ
 Crestron Electronics
 MegaChips Technology America
 Shout! Factory LLC
 Visible Light Digital Inc
 Dalet UK Ltd.
 Megogo LLC
 Sirius Pixels
 Vivo Mobile Communications
 Deluxe Entertainment Services  Group
 MTI Film
 Socionext, Inc.
 Vizio
 Digital Vision
 Novatek Microelectronics Corp.
 Spears & Munsil
 Warner Bros. Entertainment
 DTS, Inc.
 Omnitek
 Spin Digital Video Technologies GmbH
 Weka Media Publishing
 Encoding.com Inc.
 OnePlus Technology (Shenzhen) Co., Ltd
 Synaptics, Inc.
 Xi'an NovaStar Tech Co., Ltd.
 Enteractive GmbH
 Onkyo Corporation
 T1 Technologies
 Yamzz IP BV
 EON 247, A Public Benefit Corporation
 Oppo Digital, Inc.
 Tatung Technology Inc.
Shenzhen Amoonsky Technology Co.,LTD.

HDR10+ certified products
Certified product categories include:
 Ultra-High Definition displays
 Ultra-High Definition Blu-ray disc players
 Systems-on-chip (SoC)
 Set-top boxes
 A/V Receivers
 Streaming applications
 Mobile devices
 Inflight Entertainment Systems

References

External links
 

High dynamic range
Ultra-high-definition television